Matthew Peter King (c.1773 – January 1823) was an English composer, mainly of light operas.

Life
Little is known of his life. King was born in London about 1773, and studied musical composition under Charles Frederick Horn. He lived mainly in London, where he died in January 1823.

Compositions
King wrote the music to a number of dramatic pieces, most of which were produced at the Lyceum Theatre, London. These include:
 Matrimony, comic opera, words by James Kenney, 1804
 The Invisible Girl, and The Weathercock, 1806
 False Alarms, comic opera, music by King and John Braham, words by J. Kenney, 1807
 One O'clock, or The Wood Demon, comic opera, music by King and Kenney, words by M. G. Lewis, 1807
 Ella Rosenberg, melodrama, by J. Kenney, 1807
 Up all Night, or The Smugglers' Cave, comic opera, words by S. J. Arnold, 1809
 Plots, or The North Tower, melodramatic opera, words by S. J. Arnold, 1810
 Oh! this Love, comic opera, words by J. Kenney, 1810
 The Americans, music by King and Braham, 1811
 Timour the Tartar, romantic melodrama, by M. G. Lewis, 1811
 Turn him out, musical farce, words by J. Kenney, 1812
 The Fisherman's Hut, music by King and Davy, 1819

King composed a number of glees, ballads, and piano pieces, as well as an oratorio, The Intercession, which was produced at Covent Garden in 1817. From this, Eve's lamentation, "Must I leave thee, Paradise?" became very popular.

Literature
He was the author of:
 Thorough Bass made easy to every Capacity (1796)
 A General Treatise on Music, particularly on Harmony or Thorough Bass (1800; new edition 1809)
 Introduction to the Theory and Practice of Singing at First Sight (1806)
 He edited The Harmonist, a Collection of Glees and Madrigals from the Classic Poets (1814)

His son, C. M. King, published some songs in 1826.

References

Attribution

External links
 
 Matthew Peter King at Associated Chamber Music Players

1773 births
1823 deaths
English opera composers
English music theorists